Pontibacter soli  is a bacterium from the genus of Pontibacter which has been isolated from soil from the Desert Park of Huyang forest in Xinjiang in China.

References 

Cytophagia
Bacteria described in 2014